All the Rage is the debut studio album by English new wave band General Public, released on 28 January 1984 by I.R.S. Records. It was recorded digitally. After his expulsion from the Clash, Mick Jones was a founding member of General Public. Though he is listed in the credits of the album as a member, Jones left General Public part way through the recording process and was replaced by Kevin White. White's picture appears on the back cover; Jones' picture does not. Jones did play guitar on many of the album's tracks however, including "Tenderness". The album spent 39 weeks on the US Billboard 200 chart and reached its peak position of No. 26 in mid-February 1985. However, it failed to chart in their home country.

The eponymous track "General Public" was the first single released from the album, peaking at No. 60 on the UK Singles Chart in 1984. Later in the year, the band fared even better in North America, where their second single "Tenderness" was a Top 30 hit in Canada (No. 11) and the US (No. 27). The song's success benefited from appearing in the John Hughes films Sixteen Candles (1984) and Weird Science (1985) from the time period, and it would later appear in Amy Heckerling's Clueless (1995) and in the horror film Devil's Due (2014).

Critical reception

In a retrospective review for AllMusic, critic Stewart Mason wrote of the album, "All the Rage is certainly an album of its time -- those weedy synth-drums on the otherwise kinda funky "As a Matter of Fact" are a dead giveaway that this was recorded in 1984—but it sounds less dated than many of its contemporaries due to Wakeling's keen songwriting skills."

Track listing
Side one
 "Hot You're Cool" (Mickey Billingham, Roger Charlery, Horace Panter, Dave Wakeling) – 3:47
 "Tenderness" (Billingham, Charlery, Wakeling) – 3:34
 "Anxious" (Charlery, Wakeling) – 4:19
 "Never You Done That" (Billingham, Charlery, Wakeling) – 4:08
 "Burning Bright" (Billingham, Charlery, Wakeling) – 4:30

Side two
 "As a Matter of Fact" (Billingham, Charlery, Panter, Wakeling) – 5:22
 "Are You Leading Me On?" (Charlery, Panter, Wakeling) – 3:09
 "Day-to-Day" (Charlery, Wakeling) – 3:28
 "Where's the Line?" (Billingham, Charlery, Panter, Wakeling) – 4:09
 "General Public" (Charlery, Wakeling) – 4:22

Personnel
Credits are adapted from the All the Rage liner notes.

General Public
 Dave Wakeling — vocals; guitar
 Ranking Roger — vocals; bass guitar; keyboards; drums
 Mickey Billingham — keyboards; vocals
 Kevin White — guitar
 Horace Panter — bass guitar
 Andy "Stoker" Growcott — drums
 Mick Jones — guitar (on "Hot You’re Cool", "Tenderness", "Never You Done That", "As a Matter of Fact", "Where’s the Line?" and possibly other tracks)

Additional musicians
 Gary Barnacle — saxophone on "General Public"
 Saxa — saxophone on "General Public"
 Michael "Bami" Rose — saxophone on "Anxious"
 Vin Gordon — trombone on "Anxious"
 Steve Sidwell — trumpet on "Where's the Line?"
 Eddie "Tan Tan" Thornton — trumpet on "Anxious"
 Bob Porter — bassoon on "Tenderness"
 Aswad Horn Section — brass on "Anxious"
 Justine Carpenter — backing vocals on "Tenderness", "Burning Bright" and "General Public"
 Alicia Previn — violin

Technical
 Colin Fairley, Gavin MacKillop — recording; mixing
 Peter Ashworth — photography

Charts

References

External links
 

General Public albums
1984 debut albums
I.R.S. Records albums